James Arthur Hoffman Jr. (born January 15, 1951) is an American soccer coach and former player.  He is currently Director of Coaching - Academy for the Virginia Rush.

Playing career

High school and college
Hoffman attended Conrad Weiser Middle School where he played polo, soccer and baseball, graduating in 1968.  He then attended East Stroudsburg University of Pennsylvania playing four seasons of soccer from 1968 to 1971.  He continued to attend East Stroudsbourg, working as an assistant coach until he attained his undergraduate (1972.  He later earned a master's degree in Physical Education and Recreation in 1977.

Professional
Hoffman played professionally in the Canadian National Soccer League.

Coaching

College and professional
He coached Alderson-Broaddus College from 1973 to 1975, then SUNY Fredonia from 1975 to 1977.
He was assistant coach for the NASL's Houston Hurricanes and Edmonton Drillers.  He also coached the Boston Breakers of the WUSA.  The Breakers fired him on August 11, 2002.  In 2005, he was hired to coach the Virginia Beach Mariners of the USL First Division.

National teams
Hoffman was an assistant coach of the United States U-17 men's side that finished seventh in the FIFA U-17 World Cup at Japan in 1993.  He was head coach of the United States U-20 men's side that went to the 9th World Youth Championships at Malaysia in July 1997.  He was head coach of the 1999 U.S. Women's Pan American Games team that won the gold medal, and assistant coach to the Women's National Team that won the 1999 FIFA Women's World Cup.  He holds the USSF "A" license, and teaches that advanced course to other coaches.  He also coached the US Paralympic soccer team from 2002 until 2015.

Personal
He and his wife Susan have two children, Scott and Samantha.  Hoffman is an avid golfer.

References

External links
 Announcement of Hoffman's hiring by the Mariners
 ESU profile

Living people
1951 births
American soccer players
American expatriate soccer players
American soccer coaches
Soccer players from Pennsylvania
East Stroudsburg Warriors men's soccer players
North American Soccer League (1968–1984) coaches
Women's United Soccer Association coaches
USL First Division coaches
American women's soccer coaches
Association football defenders